Joaquín Suárez  was a Uruguayan politician.

Joaquín Suárez may also refer to:

 Joaquín Suárez (town), village in southern Uruguay named after the politician
 Joaquín Suárez (footballer) (born 2002), Venezuelan footballer